Loretto is an unincorporated community and census-designated place in Boone County, Nebraska, United States. As of the 2010 census, the community had a population of 42.

History
Loretto was originally called Loran, in honor of Loran Clark, a pioneer settler, but when it was discovered another town of that name already existed elsewhere in the state, it was renamed Loretto in order to avoid repetition. The present name is after Loreto, in Italy. A post office was established at Loretto in 1888, and remained in operation until it was discontinued in 1971. A state bank named Loretto State Bank was established in 1909. At its peak in the 1920s Loretto was also home to a cheese factory, several general stores, a butcher shop, and hotel.

Geography
Loretto is located in north-central Boone County along Beaver Creek, a tributary of the Loup River. Nebraska Highway 14 passes through the CDP, leading southeast  to Albion, the county seat, and north  to Petersburg.

Demographics

References

Census-designated places in Boone County, Nebraska
Census-designated places in Nebraska